Ncapai (also spelt as Ncapayi or Ncaphayi) was the king of the Bhaca people between 1826 until his death in 1845. He was the second son from the first wife of King Madzikane ka Zulu; the first born being Sonyangwe his elder brother. He resided at his father's royal residence in Mpoza, the great place  facing Mganu mountains and also built another residence in the nearby Lutateni. While trying to attack the Mpondo people, due to the Maitland treaty, he fell off a cliff and died in a place called Nowalala, near Ntabankulu in March 1846. Faku kaNgqungqushe ordered that he must be killed to save him from the pain and agony he had suffered for days after he had plunged beneath the cliff. Ncapayi is said to have been a ruthless freebooter.

See also
List of Bhaca kings

References

Ethnic groups in South Africa
19th-century monarchs in Africa
Monarchies of South Africa
1800s births
1846 deaths